Rate of return pricing or Target-return pricing is a method of which a company will set the price of its product based on their desired returns on said product. This method is used primarily by companies that either have a lot of capital or have a monopoly on the market and when an investor requests a specific return on their investment. In a competitive market this method is not as strong due to its focus being aimed at the final profit margins. If a competitor is able to set a lower price, it could prevent the product from being bought and reaching the desired profit margin.

Formula 
The formula is: Target-return pricing = unit cost + [(desired return on investment * invested capital) / expected unit sales]

For example, assume a firm invests $100 million in order to produce and market designer snowflakes, and they estimate that with demand for designer snowflakes being what it is, they can sell 2 million flakes per year. Further, from preliminary production data they know that at that level of output their average total cost is $50 per flake. Total annual costs would be $100 million (2 million units at $50 each). Next, management decides they want a 20% return on investment (ROI) which is $20 million (20% of a $100 million investment).

Enter this data into the formula:

Target-return pricing = 50 + [(0.2 *100 million) / 2 million]

Target-return pricing = 50 + (20 million / 2 million)

Target-return pricing = 50 + 10

Target-return pricing = 60

Thus the price for the snowflakes will be $60 each.

Disadvantages 
This a is a very problematic pricing method as it only works within certain requirements. Such requirements include that the company must either have a monopoly on the market or there is very little competition in the market. If there is high competition within the market than other competitor will be able to adjust their prices in order to attract more customers. This will effect the amount of sales thus altering the ROI. In order to try and reach the desired ROI they would have to increase the price thus creating less sales. Another disadvantage is that the cost of any product is not constant and the average cost per unit is what is used in the formula. If demand decreases than operational costs will increase per unit produced. As unit cost increases so does the target-return price created a less desirable product. the biggest of the disadvantages is based on the assumption of how many units they are going to sell. Because a company can only estimate at the amount of units they are going to sell, it is not always going to be accurate. If they fall short of their estimates than they are guaranteed to not meet their desired ROI.

References

Pricing
Financial ratios